Darby may refer to:

Places

United States 
 Darby, Idaho, an unincorporated community
 Darby, Montana, a town
 Darby, North Carolina, an unincorporated community
 Darby Township, Madison County, Ohio
 Darby Township, Pickaway County, Ohio
 Darby Township, Union County, Ohio
 Lake Darby, Ohio
 Darby, Pennsylvania, a borough
 Darby station
 Darby Township, Delaware County, Pennsylvania
 Darby Creek (Pennsylvania), a tributary of the Delaware River

Other places 
 Darby River, Victoria, Australia
 Darby Green, Yateley, North East Hampshire, England
 Camp Darby, U.S. military camp in Italy
 Darby Generating Station, a peaker plant in Pickaway County, Ohio

Other uses 
 Darby (name), a given name and surname, including a list of people with the name, as well as those named D'Arby
 Hurricane Darby (disambiguation)
 USS Darby (DE-218), US Navy destroyer escort
 Darby, New Hampshire, a fictional town in a series of novels by Ernest Hebert
 Darby Bible, a 1890 translation of the Holy Bible
 Darbies, or Darby handcuffs, the most common type of Victorian handcuffs
 Darby Pop Publishing, an American comic book publishing company
 Darby FC, a Canadian soccer club

See also
 Darby and Joan, a British expression for a happily married couple
 Derby (disambiguation)

Hurricane 2022
Hurricane Darby is a category 4 Hurricane.